Jhon Epam Nwankwo (born 2 May 1983) is an Equatoguinean former footballer who played as a striker.

Club career
Epam has played for The Panters F.C. in the Equatoguinean Premier League. In 2008, he moved to Spain. There, he played for Villaverde Boetticher in the Preferente de la Comunidad de Madrid Group 2).

References

External links
Fútbol Esta

1983 births
Living people
Sportspeople from Malabo
Equatoguinean footballers
Association football forwards
Divisiones Regionales de Fútbol players
Equatorial Guinea international footballers
Equatoguinean expatriate footballers
Equatoguinean expatriate sportspeople in Spain
Expatriate footballers in Spain
Equatoguinean people of Nigerian descent